The 1977 World Junior Curling Championships were held from February 27 to March 3 at Laval University in Sainte-Foy, Quebec, Canada. The tournament only consisted of a men's event.

Teams

Round robin

  Teams to playoffs
  Teams to tiebreaker

Tiebreaker

Playoffs

Final standings

Awards
 WJCC Sportsmanship Award:  Donald Barcome Jr.

All-Star Team:
Skip:  Donald Barcome Jr.
Third:  Mats Nyberg
Second:  Gary Mueller
Lead:  Roar Rise

References

1977 in Quebec
Curling competitions in Quebec City
1977 in Canadian curling
World Junior Curling Championships
International curling competitions hosted by Canada
February 1977 sports events in Canada
March 1977 sports events in Canada
1977 in youth sport